Tarleton is a village in Lancashire, England.

Tarleton may also refer to:
 Tarleton, Tasmania, a rural and residential locality in Australia
 Tarleton Gillespie, communications researcher and author
 Tarleton Hoffman Bean (1846–1916), American ichthyologist
 Tarleton (surname), several people
 List of ships named Tarleton, several ships
 Tarleton State University, a public university in Stephenville, Texas
 Lake Tarleton, in New Hampshire

See also
 Tarlton (disambiguation)